The Brave Wales is a 1968 Brazilian drama film directed by Gustavo Dahl. The directorial debut of Dahl, it is one of the most important films of the second phase of Brazil's Cinema Novo movement. It won the Special Award at the 1968 Festival de Brasília, Best Director at the 1968 Festival de Belo Horizonte, and the Best Cinematography at the 1969 Instituto Nacional do Cinema (INC) Awards.

Cast
Paulo César Pereio as Miguel Horta
Mário Lago as Augusto
Ítalo Rossi as Conrado Frota
Maria Lúcia Dahl as Clara Horta
Milton Gonçalves as sindicalist
César Ladeira as Virgílio
Paulo Gracindo as Péricles 
Joseph Guerreiro as Honório
Angelito Mello as governor
Hugo Carvana as Pelêgo
Carlos Vereza as Rodrigues

References

External links
 

1968 drama films
1968 films
Brazilian drama films
Films about Brazilian military dictatorship
1968 directorial debut films
1960s Portuguese-language films